Rory William McKenzie (born 7 October 1993) is a Scottish footballer playing as a midfielder for Kilmarnock.

Club career

Kilmarnock
Born in Irvine, raised in Troon and a product of the youth system at Kilmarnock, McKenzie made his senior debut for the club as a substitute in a 1–1 draw against Inverness CT on 9 April 2011.

In the 2012–13 season, he came on as a sub in the first two fixtures. He then started his first game against Dundee Utd on 25 August 2012, where he scored a minute into the second half, as Killie went on to win 3–1.

On 14 May 2013, McKenzie signed a new contract, keeping him at Kilmarnock until Summer 2016. In the 2014–15 season, McKenzie scored the only goal in a 1–0 win over Ayr United in the Ayrshire Derby.

He signed a further contract in summer 2016, and was the only one of several home-grown players to remain at the club after the squad was overhauled following an 11th-place finish in the Scottish Premiership which required them to defeat Falkirk to keep their place in the top division.

Brechin City loan
On 27 January 2012, McKenzie signed for Brechin City on loan until the end of the 2011–12 season. He scored 7 goals in his stint at the club, including a double in a 2–2 draw with Cowdenbeath.

International career
McKenzie was selected for the Scotland under-19s, making his debut in May 2011.

He is also eligible to play for the Trinidad and Tobago national football team through a grandmother.

Career statistics

References

External links

1993 births
Living people
Scottish footballers
Scotland under-21 international footballers
Scottish people of Trinidad and Tobago descent
British sportspeople of Trinidad and Tobago descent
Association football forwards
Scotland youth international footballers
Kilmarnock F.C. players
Brechin City F.C. players
Scottish Football League players
Scottish Premier League players
Scottish Professional Football League players
People from Troon
Footballers from South Ayrshire